Grandview Island is an island on the Ohio River in Tyler County, West Virginia. Grandview Island lies between New Matamoras, Ohio and Friendly, West Virginia. The island takes its name from a small community to its southwest on the Ohio shore by the name of Grandview. Grandview Island is protected as part of the Ohio River Islands National Wildlife Refuge.

See also 
List of islands of West Virginia

References

River islands of West Virginia
Islands of Tyler County, West Virginia
Islands of the Ohio River